Robert Ignatius Owens (October 7, 1946 – February 4, 2022) was an American politician and businessman.

Owens was born in Worcester, Massachusetts, and grew up in Framingham, Massachusetts. He went to St. Stephens School and Marian High School in Framingham, Massachusetts. Owens graduated from Harvard College in 1968. He served in the United States Navy during the Vietnam War in 1969. In 1972, he served as an administrative aide to Massachusetts state senator Ed Burke. Owens served in the Massachusetts House of Representatives from 1973 to 1975 and was a Democrat. Owens then served as an administrative assistant to United States Representative Robert Drinan. Owens was involved in the newspaper and real estate businesses. He died on February 4, 2022, at the age of 75.

References

1946 births
2022 deaths
People from Framingham, Massachusetts
Politicians from Worcester, Massachusetts
Businesspeople from Massachusetts
Military personnel from Massachusetts
Harvard College alumni
Democratic Party members of the Massachusetts House of Representatives